Built for Whatever is the third studio album by American rapper Tee Grizzley. It was released through Atlantic Records and  300 Entertainment on May 7, 2021. The album features guest appearances from the late King Von, Quavo, Young Dolph, YNW Melly, Lil Durk, Lil Tjay, Grizzley's younger brother Baby Grizzley, G Herbo, Allstar Lee, Mu, and Big Sean. Production was handled by Chopsquad DJ, Hit-Boy, and Helluva.

Background
Tee Grizzley stated that "the title of this album is my whole life in one sentence", further explaining that "the songs on the album and the things I refer to lyrically on each track reflect pieces of my real life. The name of this album is exactly what I am – built for whatever". The font of the songs written in the track listing of the album is also the same font that is used in the series of action-adventure game Grand Theft Auto, which Grizzley is an avid fan of, as he created a Grand Theft Auto "Grizzley World" server that he played fans snippets of songs from the album a few days before it was released and also made a gaming team called Grizzley Gang Gaming.

Singles
Tee Grizzley released the album's lead single, "Late Night Calls", on February 5, 2021. He followed it up with "White Lows Off Designer", featuring fellow American rapper Lil Durk, which was released as the second single on March 19, 2021. The third and final single, "Never Bend Never Fold", a collaboration with fellow American rapper G Herbo, was released on April 16, 2021.

Release and promotion
On April 29, 2021, Tee Grizzley announced the album alongside its release date and artwork through social media. The track listing was revealed on May 3, 2021.

Critical reception
DJ First Class from Revolt described the album as "a solid body of work that will indeed silence all haters and doubters" and "the title holds weight as Tee Grizzley lets it be known that he will beat any odds formed against him and continue to cement his legacy and provide for his family.

Track listing

Personnel

Musicians
 Tee Grizzley – primary artist 
 King Von – featured artist 
 Quavo – featured artist 
 Young Dolph – featured artist 
 YNW Melly – featured artist 
 Lil Durk – featured artist 
 Lil Tjay – featured artist 
 Baby Grizzley – featured artist 
 G Herbo – primary artist 
 Allstar Lee – featured artist 
 Mu – featured artist 
 Big Sean – featured artist

Technical
 J Lacy – mixing 
 David Kim – mixing

Charts

References

2021 albums
Tee Grizzley albums